"Talk About Love" is a song recorded by Christine Anu. It was released in October 2003 as the first and only single from her third studio album, 45 Degrees (2003). The song peaked at number 85 on the ARIA Charts.

Content
Lyrically, the song sees Anu confront someone who believes they know about love, without evidence:

"You talk about love / But I can't see any love coming out of your mind 
You talk about truth / But you don't seem to know what the truth is all about 
You talk about me / Tell me what you've done to make that come about 
Talk to me about something real, baby / Can you hear me now?"

Track listing
CD single/Digital download (021522)
 "Talk About Love" – 3:30
 "Talk About Love" (Jarrad Rogers and Tony Espie Remix) – 3:19
 "Talk About Love" (instrumental) – 3:30

Charts

References

2003 songs
2003 singles
Mushroom Records singles
Christine Anu songs
Songs written by Jarrad Rogers
Funk songs
Australian pop rock songs
Songs written by Gary Pinto